The 2011–12 Irish League Cup (known as the Irn-Bru League Cup for sponsorship reasons) was the 26th edition of Northern Ireland's secondary football knock-out cup competition. The competition was contested by the 12 members of the IFA Premiership, as well as the 30 members of the IFA Championship. The competition began on 27 August 2011 and ended with the final on 28 January 2012.

Lisburn Distillery were the defending champions, following a 2–1 victory over Portadown in the previous season's final. However, they were eliminated in the Third Round by Crusaders.

Crusaders went on to win the cup for the second time by defeating Coleraine 1–0 in the final.

First round
The draw for the first round was made on 22 August 2011. The games were played in a one-leg format on 27 August and 30 August 2011.

Ards, Bangor, Chimney Corner, Dergview, Knockbreda, Limavady United, Newry City, PSNI, Tobermore United and Wakehurst all received byes into the Second Round.

|}

Second round
The draw for the second round was made on 2 September 2011. The games were played in a one-leg format on 20 and 21 September 2011.

The 12 members of the IFA Premiership entered at this stage, along with the 10 winners from the First Round matches, and the 10 teams who received byes.

|}

Third round
The draw for the third round was made on 21 September 2011. The games were played in a one-leg format on 12 October 2011.

|}

Quarter-finals
The draw for the Quarter-finals was made on 13 October 2011. The games were played on 16 November 2011.

|}

Semi-finals

Final

References

External links
 Results

Lea
2011–12 domestic association football cups
2011-12